Neltje Doubleday may refer to:

 Neltje Blanchan (1865–1918; born Neltje Blanchan De Graff; married name Neltje Doubleday) U.S. nature writer under the pseudonym Neltje Blanchan; grandmother of Neltje Kings
 Neltje Doubleday Kings (born 1934; as Neltje Doubleday) U.S. artist under the pseudonym Neltje; and philanthropist; granddaughter of Neltje De Graff

See also
 Doubleday (disambiguation)